The Cross-National Equivalent File (CNEF) contains data from general population household-based panel surveys fielded in Australia, Canada, Germany, Great Britain, Japan, Korea, Russia, Switzerland and the United States. Each of these countries fields a longitudinal survey of households and their inhabitants. All of the surveys follow the set of people living in the set of households surveyed initially. With the exception of the Japan Household Panel Study, all of the surveys also follow the members of the original households, labeled as "original sample members" when they move away and form new households. Almost all of the surveys also follow people who joined a household of an "original sample member" (through marriage or cohabitation).  Researchers at institutions in each country collaborate with CNEF to harmonize a subset of the data from each survey. The harmonized data get used, individually or as a set, by researchers who compare social and economic outcomes over time and across countries. Researchers exploit a cross-national design to understand whether differences in observed outcomes can be explained by differences in policies, social, and economic situations one observes across countries. The CNEF is managed by Dean Lillard and Temur Akhmedov at  the Department of Human Sciences at The Ohio State University (US).

Participant surveys
British Household Panel Survey (BHPS), UK 
 Understanding Society, the UK Household Longitudinal Study (UKHLS), UK 
Household, Income and Labour Dynamics in Australia Survey (HILDA), Australia
 Japan Household Panel Study (JHPS), Japan
 Korea Labor Income Panel Study (KLIPS), Korea
Panel Study of Income Dynamics (PSID), USA
Socio-Economic Panel (SOEP), Germany
 Survey of Labour and Income Dynamics (SLID), Canada
 Swiss Household Panel (SHP), Switzerland
 Russia Longitudinal Monitoring Survey (RLMS-HSE), Russia

External links
Official website URL accessed 5 December 2019.

Economic data
Household surveys
Panel data
Ohio State University